Cyrille L'Helgoualch (born 25 September 1970) is a French former professional footballer who played in the Football League for Mansfield Town.

References

External links
 The Sweeper

1970 births
Living people
French footballers
Association football defenders
English Football League players
Mansfield Town F.C. players
Angers SCO players
Walsall F.C. players
SSV Ulm 1846 players
French expatriate footballers
Expatriate footballers in England
French expatriate sportspeople in England
Expatriate footballers in Germany
French expatriate sportspeople in Germany